Arthur Roger Ekirch (born February 6, 1950) is University Distinguished Professor of history at Virginia Tech in the United States. He was a Guggenheim fellow in 1998. 

The son of intellectual historian Arthur A. Ekirch Jr. and Dorothy Gustafson, Roger Ekirch is internationally known for his pioneering research into pre-industrial sleeping patterns that was first published in "Sleep We Have Lost: Pre-Industrial Slumber in the British Isles" and later in his award-winning 2005 book At Day's Close: Night in Times Past.

Selected publications

Books
 "Poor Carolina": Politics and society in Colonial North Carolina, 1729–1776, University of North Carolina Press, 1981. 
 Bound for America: The Transportation of British Convicts to the Colonies, 1718–1775, Oxford University Press, 1987.
 At Day's Close: Night in Times Past, W.W. Norton, 2005.
 Birthright: The True Story of the Kidnapping of Jemmy Annesley, W.W. Norton, 2010.
 American Sanctuary: Mutiny, Martyrdom, and National Identity in the Age of Revolution, Pantheon, 2017.
 La Grande Transformation du Sommeil: Comment la Revolution Indsustrielle a Boulverse Nos Nuits, Editions Amersterdam, 2021.

Articles
 "Sleep We Have Lost: Pre-Industrial Slumber in the British Isles", The American Historical Review, 2001.
 "The Modernization of Western Slumber: Or, Does Insomnia Have a History?", Past & Present, 2015.
 "Segmented Sleep in Preindustrial Societies", Sleep, 2016.
 "What Sleep Research Can Learn From History", Sleep Health, 2018.

See also 
 Biphasic and polyphasic sleep

References

External links
 Rethinking Sleep (NY Times)
 Segmented sleep (Harpers)

21st-century American historians
American male non-fiction writers
People from Washington, D.C.
Dartmouth College alumni
Johns Hopkins University alumni
Virginia Tech faculty
Sleep researchers
Living people
1950 births
21st-century American male writers